Maireana ciliata, the fissure weed, is a species of flowering plant in the family Amaranthaceae. It is native to Australia (except Western Australia and Tasmania), and has been introduced to South Africa.

References

ciliata
Endemic flora of Australia
Flora of the Northern Territory
Flora of South Australia
Flora of Queensland
Flora of New South Wales
Flora of Victoria (Australia)
Taxa named by Ferdinand von Mueller
Plants described in 1975